Nigel Smith may refer to:

 Nigel Smith (footballer, born 1958), English football defender
 Nigel Smith (footballer, born 1969), English football striker
 Nigel Smith (racing driver) (born 1951), British businessman and retired auto racing driver
 Nigel Smith (alpine skier) (born 1964), British former alpine skier
 Nigel Smith (literature scholar), British literature professor
 Nigel Martin-Smith, English musical band manager who formed 1990s British boy band Take That